Federico Bruno (born 18 June 1993) is an Argentine middle- and long-distance runner. He was the winner of the 1500 metres at the 2014 South American Games and is a three-time medallist over the distance at the South American Championships in Athletics.

He also represented his country at the 2011 Pan American Games and 2010 Summer Youth Olympics. Bruno won several international junior medals regionally and broke the South American junior record for the 1500 m.

Career
Bruno was born in Concordia, Entre Ríos, and made his international debut at the 2008 South American Youth Championships in Athletics, where he came fourth in the 1500 metres. An appearance at the 2009 World Youth Championships in Athletics followed, but he failed to make it past the first round. He entered the 3000 metres for Argentina at the 2010 Summer Youth Olympics and placed fifth in the "B" final. That same year he ran a series of personal bests: 3:47.35 minutes for the 1500 m (a national junior record), 8:23.51 minutes for the 3000 m and 14:38.70 minutes for the 5000 metres.

He failed to finish at the junior race at the 2011 South American Cross Country Championships in February. Despite this, he won a senior bronze medal in the 1500 m at the 2011 South American Championships in Athletics held in Buenos Aires, running a near personal best time of 3:47.81 minutes. He did not match this form at the 2011 Pan American Junior Athletics Championships and came fourth, missing a medal by a fraction of a second. Bruno topped the podium at the 2011 South American Junior Championships in Athletics and also managed eighth in the 800 metres. His long season came to an end in October when he ran to 13th place in the 1500 m at the Pan American Games.

In May 2012 he ran four minutes for the mile to take bronze at the South American Road Mile Championships, then established a South American junior record in the 1500 m with a run of 3:40.86 minutes (breaking the long-standing mark of multiple South American record holder Hudson de Souza. He made the final at the 2012 World Junior Championships in Athletics, but finished in last place, failing to match his time from the qualifying round. He established himself as one of the region's best young runners at the 2012 South American Under-23 Championships in Athletics, winning the 1500 m and taking a silver medal in the 5000 m behind Víctor Aravena.

In the 2013 season Bruno improved his bests to 1:49.98 for the 800 m, 3:40.67 for the 1500 m and 7:56.98 for the 3000 m. He progressed in the senior ranks with a silver medal in the 1500 m at the 2013 South American Championships in Athletics. At the start of 2014 a personal best and games record of 3:39.96 minutes earned him the 1500 m gold medal at the South American Games, at which he also came fourth in the 5000 m.

Personal bests
800 metres – 1:49.98 (2013)        
1500 metres – 3:36.18 (2021)
3000 metres – 7:54.34 (2015)
5000 metres – 13:53.40 (2015)
10000 metres – 29:44.87 (2014)
10K – 29:23 (2016)
Half Marathon – 1:16:50 (2015)
Marathon - 2:15:40 (2016)

Achievements

References

External links

Living people
1993 births
Argentine male middle-distance runners
Argentine male long-distance runners
Argentine male marathon runners
Athletes (track and field) at the 2010 Summer Youth Olympics
Athletes (track and field) at the 2015 Pan American Games
Athletes (track and field) at the 2019 Pan American Games
Pan American Games competitors for Argentina
World Athletics Championships athletes for Argentina
Athletes (track and field) at the 2016 Summer Olympics
Olympic athletes of Argentina
Athletes (track and field) at the 2018 South American Games
South American Games gold medalists for Argentina
South American Games medalists in athletics
People from Concordia, Entre Ríos
Sportspeople from Entre Ríos Province
21st-century Argentine people